The St. Charles Odd Fellows Hall is  historic Odd Fellows hall located at St. Charles, St. Charles County, Missouri.  It is a 3 1/2-story, brick Second Empire-styled building that was built in 1878. A small two-story rear addition was constructed about 1900. It served historically as a clubhouse, as an auditorium, and as a financial institution.

It was listed on the National Register of Historic Places in 1987. It is included in the St. Charles Historic District, and is located across from the BPOE No. 690.

References

Individually listed contributing properties to historic districts on the National Register in Missouri
Clubhouses on the National Register of Historic Places in Missouri
Second Empire architecture in Missouri
Cultural infrastructure completed in 1878
Buildings and structures in St. Charles County, Missouri
National Register of Historic Places in St. Charles County, Missouri
Odd Fellows buildings in Missouri